Bridgetown High School is a comprehensive public co-educational middle day school, located in Bridgetown, a regional centre in the South West region,  south of Perth, Western Australia.

The school was established in 1954 as a high school catering for students from Year 8 to Year 10, and students who are to complete Year 11 and 12 travel to Manjimup Senior High School.

Enrolments at the school were 138 in 2007, 151 in 2008, 155 in 2009, 133 in 2010, 125 in 2011 and 119 in 2012.

See also

List of schools in rural Western Australia

References

External links
 Bridgetown High School website

South West (Western Australia)
Public high schools in Western Australia
Educational institutions established in 1954
1954 establishments in Australia